José Luis Álvarez Núñez (born 8 December 1960) is a Chilean former professional footballer who played as a forward for clubs in Chile, Brazil, Peru and Bolivia.

Club career
A product of Deportes La Serena youth system, he was promoted to the first team by the coach Alfonso Sepúlveda and played alongside Sergio Ahumada, his football idol. Then he moved to Colo-Colo in 1981 where he scored 18 goals in official matches.

In Chile, he also played for O'Higgins, Unión La Calera, Magallanes, Deportes Arica, Cobreandino, Deportes Melipilla and Municipal Talagante.

Abroad, he played for Fluminense in Brazil, Sporting Cristal in Peru and Jorge Wilstermann in Bolivia.

International career
Álvarez represented Chile at under-20 level in the 1979 South American Championship.

At senior level, he made an appearance for the Chile national team in a friendly match of the  versus Uruguay in 29 April, making an assist to his teammate Manuel Rojas.

Coaching career
He has worked as coach for amateur clubs and football academies such as the Colo-Colo Academies based in Doñihue.

Personal life
Born in La Serena, Chile, his parents were José Álvarez and María Adriana Núñez.

He is well known by his nickname Pelé Álvarez due to the fact he used to make feints like the Brazilian historical player.

Following his retirement, he studied and worked as a bank clerk.

He has taken part of the "Colo-Colo de Todos los Tiempos" (Colo-Colo from All Time), a team made up by historical players of Colo-Colo that plays friendly matches around the country.

Honours

Club
Colo-Colo
 Chilean Primera División (2): 1981, 1983
 Copa Polla Gol (2): 1981, 1982

Fluminense
 Campeonato Carioca (1): 1984

References

External links
 José Luis Álvarez at PartidosdeLaRoja 
 José Luis Álvarez at playmakerstats.com (English version of ceroacero.es)
 José Luis Álvarez at SoloFutbol 
 

1960 births
Living people
People from La Serena
Chilean footballers
Chilean expatriate footballers
Chile international footballers
Chile under-20 international footballers
Deportes La Serena footballers
Colo-Colo footballers
O'Higgins F.C. footballers
Fluminense FC players
Unión La Calera footballers
Deportes Magallanes footballers
Magallanes footballers
San Marcos de Arica footballers
Trasandino footballers
Sporting Cristal footballers
C.D. Jorge Wilstermann players
Deportes Melipilla footballers
Primera B de Chile players
Chilean Primera División players
Campeonato Brasileiro Série A players
Peruvian Primera División players
Bolivian Primera División players
Tercera División de Chile players
Chilean expatriate sportspeople in Brazil
Chilean expatriate sportspeople in Peru
Chilean expatriate sportspeople in Bolivia
Expatriate footballers in Brazil
Expatriate footballers in Peru
Expatriate footballers in Bolivia
Association football forwards
Chilean football managers